Cocora may refer to:

 Cocora, Ialomița, a commune in Romania
 Cocora, a tributary of the Ialomița in Dâmbovița County, Romania
 Cocora, a tributary of the Rebricea in Iași County, Romania
 Cocora Valley, Colombia

See also